Ashoka (formerly branded Ashoka: Innovators for the Public) is an American-based nonprofit organization that promotes social entrepreneurship by connecting and supporting individual social entrepreneurs. Their stated mission is "the creation of an association of the world's leading social entrepreneurs—men and women with system-changing solutions for the world's most urgent social problems—and fostering a global culture of everyone being a changemaker for the good of all".

History
Growing up, Bill Drayton was inspired by Mahatma Gandhi and the Civil Rights Movement. Drayton wanted to mitigate income inequality through social entrepreneurship. Drayton founded Ashoka in 1980.

The organization was named after the Emperor Ashoka The Great, the ruler of the Maurya Empire during the 3rd century BC. Emperor Ashoka recognized the suffering that he had caused by unifying his empire, and he promoted religious and philosophical tolerance and the paramount importance of morality when working for the public.

Fellows
Ashoka identifies social entrepreneurs with solutions to social problems who seek to make large-scale changes to society. Ashoka searches for individuals who have vision, creativity, and determination and are motivated by public gain rather than personal gain.

Social entrepreneurs who pass the selection process are called Ashoka fellows.  Each Ashoka fellow receives a financial stipend that they can use to pay for their personal expenses so that they can fully devote their time to the pursuit of their innovative social ideas.  The size of the stipend is decided on a case-by-case basis, according to the cost of living in the entrepreneur's local area.  The stipend is available for up to three years.  The organization is very clear that the stipend is only for living expenses and not for funding the social entrepreneur's initiative or organization.

Ashoka fellows are connected with successful entrepreneurs in order to help the fellows succeed in implementing their social ideas. Ashoka fellows are expected to regularly participate in meetings with other Ashoka fellows.  Ultimately, the Ashoka fellow is expected to convert an innovative solution into a self-sustaining institution.

Ashoka funds the stipends by raising funds from donors, which it uses as venture capital.

Of Ashoka fellows with ventures that are more than five years old, Ashoka says that more than 80 percent have had their solution implemented by others; 59 percent have directly affected national policy; and each Ashoka fellow is helping an average of 174,000 people.

Organizational policies
According to the organization, it does not accept funding from any government, although it has partnered with governments on projects and it received a $1,585,600 Paycheck Protection Program loan in 2020.

While Ashoka says it does not petition governments for social change, it provides advice to organizations such as the World Bank when requested.

Citizen-sector organization
While the United States Internal Revenue Service has approved Ashoka's headquarters as a 501(c)(3) nonprofit organization, and some countries consider Ashoka to be a non-governmental organization, Ashoka itself prefers the term citizen-sector organization in order to emphasize what it is, rather than what it is not. According to Ashoka, citizen-sector organizations are groups of citizens who care and act to serve others and cause needed change.

References

External links
 

Non-profit organizations based in Arlington, Virginia
Organizations established in 1980
Social entrepreneurship in the United States
Charities based in Virginia
Memorials to Ashoka
Ashoka Fellows